Only by the Night is the fourth studio album by American rock band Kings of Leon, released in September 2008 through RCA Records. Writing for the band's fourth album commenced just days after the release of their third, Because of the Times. The album was recorded by producers Jacquire King and Angelo Petraglia in April 2008 at Nashville's Blackbird Studio.

Only by the Night experienced commercial success, peaking inside the top 10 of over 10 countries. The album was certified the best-selling album in Australia, certified nine times platinum. It also went on to be the highest selling album of 2008 in Australia, the third best selling album of 2008 in the UK, winning two Brit Awards, and the 18th best-selling album of the 2000s in the UK. Furthermore, two singles from the album have found high chartings, "Sex on Fire" coming in at number one in Ireland,  the UK, Australia, and on the United States' Hot Modern Rock Tracks, and at number two in New Zealand. The album's second single "Use Somebody" also charted at number two in the UK, and at number two in Australia, along with being the band's first top 10 hit in the U.S. The album was nominated for Best Rock Album at the 2009 Grammy Awards, with the song "Sex on Fire" receiving two nominations itself. Worldwide sales of the album exceed 6.2 million copies, according to a press release by the band.

"Sex on Fire" came in at number one on the Triple J Hottest 100, 2008, with "Use Somebody" number three, "Closer" number 24 and "Crawl" number 70.

Production and recording history
In September 2007, lead singer Caleb Followill confirmed to NME that tracks were already being worked on for a fourth album, only a few days after the release of the band's third album, Because of the Times.
Recording began in February 2008 in Nashville's Blackbird Studios with assistant engineer, Lowell Reynolds. According to producer Jacquire King, the live performances of the main parts of each song were recorded onto 16-track analog tape and later transferred to a Pro Tools system for overdubbing and mixing. On June 23, 2008, the release date of September 22, 2008 was set and the new title was announced.

Release
"Crawl" was released via the band's website as a free download for a short time, although it was not the first proper single. The first single "Sex on Fire," was released September 15, 2008. The same day, music website Last.fm was the first to make the entire album available for streaming. The music video for "Sex on Fire" was later made available to stream on their website and YouTube channel. The song "Use Somebody" was announced as the second single and released in October 2008. The song was a massive hit, peaking at number 4 on the Billboard Hot 100 in the United States, number 2 in the United Kingdom, and performing well in Australia and several other countries. The third single from the album was "Revelry," released March 2, 2009.

"Notion" is the fourth single from the album. The video was released on June 1 and the song appeared on radio on June 29.
The song was another success for the group, peaking at #1 on the Billboard Alternative Songs.

In Australia, the song "Manhattan" was released to radio as another single. The song spent four weeks on the singles chart and peaked at number 38 and reached number two on the National Airplay Chart. The song has also had heavy rotation on UK radio station's such as Xfm. Another fan favorite was the album's opening track "Closer," which features a three note riff by bass player Jared Followill that utilises a Boss ME50 multi-effects pedal to add a distinctive octave sweep reminiscent of the DigiTech Whammy.

Critical reception

Metacritic, which uses a weighted average, assigned a score of 63/100 based on 30 critics, indicating "generally favorable" reviews. A discrepancy between ratings of the North American and the UK press can be noted. The U.S. online publications Pitchfork Media, PopMatters and JustPressPlay gave the album a 3.8/10, 2/10 and 4/10 respectively, while the album received ratings of 5/5 and 4.5/5 from the UK's The Observer and Virgin Media. Record sales showed it chasing Coldplay's Viva la Vida or Death and All His Friends for the fastest selling album of the year in Ireland and the UK.

Accolades
Only by the Night received a nomination for Best Rock Album at the 51st Grammy Awards with the single "Sex on Fire" receiving two nominations for Best Rock Performance by a Duo or Group with Vocal and Best Rock Song. "Sex on Fire" was awarded with the Grammy for Best Rock Performance by a Duo or Group with Vocals on February 8.

At the 52nd Grammy Awards the song "Use Somebody" won the Record of the Year, Best Rock Song and the Best Rock Performance by a Duo or Group with Vocal.

The album was also awarded "2008 Album of the Year" by the UK's Q Magazine, as well as Rolling Stone voting it as the 20th best album out of their top 50 Best Albums of 2008. The album was also awarded Best International Album at the BRIT Awards, the Meteors and the Juno Awards.

Commercial performance
Only by the Night was a massive success in the United Kingdom. At the end of September 2008, the album entered the UK Albums Chart at number one, with first week sales of over 220,000 copies. In February 2009, it was announced that Only by the Night is currently the biggest selling digital album of all-time in the UK, surpassing Amy Winehouse's Back to Black. Sales for 2008, in which Only by the Night was the third biggest selling album of the year, were 1,181,640 and a similar level of 1,078,555 for 2009, when it became the fifth biggest selling album of the year. It sold a further 340,000 units in 2010 and was placed at number 31 on the year-end chart. As of March 27, 2011, Only by the Night has spent 131 consecutive weeks inside the Top 75. As of October 2016, it has sold 2,916,779 copies in the UK.

In the U.S., the album debuted at number five on the Billboard 200, but fell to 20 the following week. It then dropped as low as 78, but then gradually moved back up the chart. After 48 weeks on the chart, the album managed to outpeak its debut position, climbing to number four. It has also managed to achieve a 2× Platinum certification for shipping three million copies. In Canada, the album debuted at number four on the Canadian Albums Chart, eventually peaking at number two.

In Australia, the album has been certified 9× Platinum, selling over 630,000 copies. It re-entered the Australia charts at 43 in September 2010. The album was the highest selling album of 2008 in Australia. The album has also been a hit in New Zealand, spending over thirty consecutive weeks in the top ten, including nine non-consecutive weeks at number one. It finished 2008 as the second highest selling album and has been certified 5× Platinum by RIANZ.

In Germany, Only by the Night has spent 104 weeks on the country's Albums Chart making it the 50th album to spend two years or longer on that chart.

Worldwide sales of the album exceed 6.2 million copies, according to a press release by the band.

Track listing

Personnel
Kings of Leon
 Caleb Followill – vocals, rhythm guitar
 Matthew Followill – lead guitar, vocals, keyboards on "Frontier City" and "Notion"
 Jared Followill – bass guitar, vocals
 Nathan Followill – drums, percussion, vocals

Additional personnel
 Angelo Petraglia – production, keyboards on "Revelry"
 Jacquire King – production, keyboards on "Use Somebody"
 Alex Fraser – triangle
 Lowell Reynolds – second engineer
 Ken Levitan & Andy Mendelsohn for Vector – management

Charts

Weekly charts

Year-end charts

Decade-end charts

Certifications

Awards

|-
| rowspan="5" style="text-align:center;"|2009
| International Album
| Brit Awards
|
|-
| Best Rock Album
| Grammy Awards
|
|-
|Best International Album
| Meteor Awards
|
|-
|Best Album
| NME Awards
|
|-
|Choice Music: Album (Group)
| Teen Choice Awards
|
|-
| style="text-align:center;"|2010
| Best International Album
| Juno Awards
|
|-

Release history

See also
 List of best-selling albums in Australia

References

2008 albums
Kings of Leon albums
Albums produced by Jacquire King
Brit Award for International Album
Juno Award for International Album of the Year albums
RCA Records albums